The 2021 Honda Indy Grand Prix of Alabama (officially known as the 2021 Honda Indy Grand Prix of Alabama presented by AmFirst) was an IndyCar motor race held on April 18, 2021 at Barber Motorsports Park in Birmingham, Alabama. It served as the season opener of the 2021 IndyCar Series and was the eleventh running of the Honda Indy Grand Prix of Alabama.

Álex Palou won the race for Chip Ganassi Racing, scoring his first career victory in his second season. Team Penske's Will Power finished second, with defending IndyCar champion Scott Dixon rounding out the podium places in third.

Background 
The event was initially scheduled to be held on April 11, 2021, after the Firestone Grand Prix of St. Petersburg, which was slated to be held on March 7 to become the season opener. However, the St. Petersburg race was rescheduled to April 25, making the Barber race the first round of the 2021 season. The event was then rescheduled from April 11 to be held on the weekend of April 17-18, a week prior to the St. Petersburg race. It marked the return of the event to the calendar, after being canceled in the previous season due to the COVID-19 pandemic.

Takuma Sato was the previous race winner, having won the race in 2019 for Rahal Letterman Lanigan Racing.

Entrants 

24 drivers have entered the race, including IndyCar Series debutants Jimmie Johnson (Chip Ganassi Racing) and Romain Grosjean (Dale Coyne Racing with Rick Ware Racing), with Scott McLaughlin (Team Penske) making his second career start after racing the season finale in 2020.

Practice

Practice 1
Practice 1 took place at 11:00 AM ET on April 17, 2021. A single red flag was called in the session, when Felix Rosenqvist made contact with the barrier while entering pit road. Álex Palou went fastest in the first practice session of the season with a time of 01:06.4721, ahead of Colton Herta and Josef Newgarden in second and third respectively.

Practice 2
Practice 2 took place at 2:40 PM ET on April 17, 2021. The session saw multiple red flags for incidents involving a stall for Dalton Kellett, contact with the Turn 14 wall for Herta, and Newgarden losing power after correcting a slide. Andretti Autosport driver Alexander Rossi finished first in the second practice session with a time of 01:06.0797, ahead of Chip Ganassi Racing duo Marcus Ericsson and Scott Dixon.

Qualifying 
Qualifying took place at 5:50 PM ET on April 17, 2021.

Qualifying classification 

 Notes
 Bold text indicates fastest time set in session.

Warmup 
Warmup took place at 11:30 AM ET on April 18, 2021.

Race 
The race started at 3:00 PM ET on April 18, 2021.

Race classification

Championship standings after the race 

Drivers' Championship standings

Engine manufacturer standings

 Note: Only the top five positions are included.

References

External links 

Grand Prix of Alabama
Honda Indy Grand Prix of Alabama
Honda Indy Grand Prix of Alabama
Honda Indy Grand Prix of Alabama